Kim Chol-gwang (born 29 January 1996) is a North Korean judoka.

He participated at the 2018 World Judo Championships, winning a medal.

In 2019, he represented North Korea at the 2019 Summer Universiade in Naples, Italy and he won one of the bronze medals in the men's 73kg event.

References

External links
 

1996 births
Living people
North Korean male judoka
Judoka at the 2018 Asian Games
Asian Games competitors for North Korea
Medalists at the 2019 Summer Universiade
Universiade bronze medalists for North Korea
Universiade medalists in judo